The Albin Express is a Swedish trailerable sailboat that was designed by Peter Norlin as a cruiser-racer and first built in 1978.

The design was intended as a competitor to the J/24.

Production
The design was built by Albin Marine in Sweden between 1978 and 1985, with about 1,400 boats completed, but it is now out of production.

Design

The Albin Express is a recreational keelboat, built predominantly of fibreglass, with wood trim. It has a 7/8 fractional sloop rig with aluminum spars, a deck-stepped mast, wire standing rigging and a single set of swept spreaders. The hull has a raked stem, a reverse transom, a transom-hung rudder controlled by a tiller and a fixed fin keel. It displaces  and carries  of ballast.

The boat is normally fitted with a small outboard motor for docking and manoeuvring.

The design has sleeping accommodation for four people, with a double "V"-berth in the bow cabin, a straight settee on the port side of the main cabin and an aft cabin with a quarter berth on the port side. The galley is located on the starboard side just forward of the companionway ladder. The galley is equipped with a two-burner stove and a sink and can be slid aft to stow out of the way. The boat layout shows no provisions for a head.

Operational history
The boat is supported by an active class club based in Germany that organizes racing events, the Deutsche Express Klassenvereinigung (English: German Express Class Association).

See also
List of sailing boat types

References

External links

Keelboats
1970s sailboat type designs
Sailing yachts
Trailer sailers
Sailboat type designs by Peter Norlin
Sailboat types built by Albin Marine